Thomas Beaumont, 1st Viscount Beaumont of Swords (c. 1582 – 8 February 1625) was an English  politician who sat in the House of Commons between 1604 and 1611. He was raised to the peerage in 1622.

Beaumont was the son of Sir Henry Beaumont of Cole Orton, Leicestershire and his wife Elizabeth Lewis, daughter of John Lewis of London. He was educated at Peterhouse, Cambridge (c. 1596) and studied law at the Inner Temple in 1610. He was knighted at Belvoir Castle on 23 April 1603.

In 1604, he was elected Member of Parliament for Tamworth. He was a Justice of the Peace for Leicestershire by 1608 to 1616 and from 1618 to at least 1623 and was appointed Sheriff of Leicestershire for 1610–11. He was a member of the Virginia Company by 1612.

He was created baronet on 17 September 1619 and created Viscount Beaumont of Swords on 20 May 1622. Swords was a town in County Dublin, and now in County Fingal.
 
Beaumont died as the result of his injuries in a duel. He had married in or before 1614 Elizabeth Sapcote, daughter of Henry Sapcote of Bracebridge, Lincolnshire and his wife Eleanor Sapcote of Huntingdonshire. They had 4 sons and 3 daughters. He was succeeded by his son Sapcote Beaumont, 2nd Viscount Beaumont of Swords.

References

 

1580s births
1625 deaths
People from Coleorton
Alumni of Peterhouse, Cambridge
Members of the Inner Temple
English MPs 1604–1611
High Sheriffs of Leicestershire
Viscounts in the Peerage of Ireland
Peers of Ireland created by James I